Manuel Aguilar y Bustamante (June 26, 1750 - May 25, 1819) was a Salvadorian ecclesiastic and revolutionary against the Spanish Empire who participated in the 1811, and 1814 independence movements.

1750 births
1819 deaths
Salvadoran Roman Catholic priests
19th-century Salvadoran people